Liu Tingting (born 8 September 1990) is a Chinese rower.

References 
 
 profile at gz2010.cn

1987 births
Living people
Chinese female rowers
Asian Games medalists in rowing
Rowers at the 2010 Asian Games
World Rowing Championships medalists for China
Asian Games gold medalists for China

Medalists at the 2010 Asian Games